Sergey Kudentsov (born 29 July 1978) is a Russian former professional cyclist.

Major results

1999
 1st  Overall Five Rings of Moscow
2003
 1st Stage 3 Tour of South China Sea
2004
 Tour of South China Sea
1st Stages 7 & 8
2006
 Tour of Chongming Island
1st Stages 2 & 4
 Tour d'Indonesia
1st Stages 2 & 8
2007
 1st Stage 6 Tour de Korea
 Tour of Hainan
1st Stages 1 & 4
2008
 Tour of South China Sea
1st Stages 5 & 6
 1st Stage 1 Tour de East Java
2009
 Tour d'Indonesia
1st Stages 3 & 8
2010
 1st  Overall Tour of Poyang Lake
1st Stages 2, 4 & 5
 1st Stage 2 Melaka Governor Cup
 Tour d'Indonesia
1st Stages 1 (TTT), 4 & 9

References

External links

1978 births
Living people
Russian male cyclists